April Records is a Danish record label (based in Copenhagen, Denmark) specialized on Scandinavian electronica music: from ambient to techno and trip hop.
List of musicians recorded on this label includes: Underworld, DJ 360°, Biosphere, Blue Foundation, Lindberg Hemmer Foundation, Thomas Knak aka Opiate, Jesper Skaaning aka Acustic, Anders Remmer aka Jet, Future 3.

Releases 
Discography:
 A-1000-A1  Matt Covington Baby I'm For Real 	(12", Promo) 	 
 APR 001  Boredom Is Deep And Mysterious (CD, Comp) 1994
 APR 002 Underworld Dark & Long 	(CD, EP) 1994
 APR 004 Double Muffled Dolphin 	My Left Side Is Out Of Sync (CD) 1994
 APR 010 Future 3 We Are The Future 3 (CD, Album) 1995
 APR 011 Double Muffled Dolphin The Lions Are Growing (CD) 1996
 APR 012 Acustic No 1 (CD, Album) 1996
 APR 014 Future 3 The Boy From West Bronx (12") 1996
 APR 015 Bjørn Svin Mer Strøm #2 (12") 1997
 APR 016 Jet Jet #1 (12") 1997
 APR 018 Bjørn Svin Mer Strøm (CD) 1997
 APR 019 XJacks Double Xposure 	(CD, Album) 1997
 APR 020 Future 3 Stay With... (2xLP) 1998
 APR 021 Acustic No 2 	(12") 1997
 APR 022 Opiate 1/3 & 1/2 EP (12", EP) 1997
 APR 023 Boredom Is Deep And Mysterious 3 (CD) 1997
 APR 024 DJ 360° And Her Tears Dropped Like Beats (12") 	1997
 APR 025 Jet Jet #2 (12") 	1997
 APR 027 Magick A Lemon, Saab 96 And A Book (CD) 1997
 APR 030 DJ 360° 33 Revolutions Per Minute (CD) 1999
 APR 042 Future 3 Reverberate EP (12", EP) 2001
 APR 043 B9 Don't Worry It's B9 (CD) 1998
 APR 046 Time Of Madness Lust Fading (CD, Maxi) 1999
 APR 047 Time Of Madness Patterns (CD) 	1999
 APR 048 Lindberg Hemmer Foundation Brazilian Architecture (LP, Album) 	2001
 APR 048 Lindberg Hemmer Foundation Brazilian Architecture (CD, Album) 	2001
 APR 049 Håkan Lidbo After The End (CD) 2000
 APR 050 Future 3 Like... (LP) 2001
 APR 051 Blue Foundation Wiseguy & Hollywood (CD, Maxi) 2000
 APR 054 Blue Foundation Blue Foundation (CD) 2001
 APR 055 DJ 360° Tag Along (Come On) (12") 2000
 APR 056 Biosphere Cirque (CD) 2000
 APR 057 Universal Funk One (2xLP) 2001
 APR 057 Universal Funk One (CD) 2001
 APR 059 Opiate While You Were Sleeping (CD, Album, Dig) 2002
 APR 062 Universal Funk Re:Done (CD) 2003
 APR 071 Alex Puddu And The Butterfly Collectors Chasing The Scorpion's Tail (CD) 2004

See also 
 List of record labels

External links
 Official site
 April Records at Discogs

Danish record labels
Record labels based in Copenhagen
Record labels established in 1991
1991 establishments in Denmark
Companies based in Copenhagen Municipality